List table of the properties and districts — listed on the California Historical Landmarks — within Nevada County, Northern California. 

Note: Click the "Map of all coordinates" link to the right to view a Google map of all properties and districts with latitude and longitude coordinates in the table below.

Listings

|}

References

See also

National Register of Historic Places listings in Nevada County, California
History of Nevada County, California
List of California Historical Landmarks

  

 
. 
List of California Historical Landmarks
H01
Protected areas of Nevada County, California
Nevada County, California
California Gold Rush
History of the Sierra Nevada (United States)